Moraitis is a surname of Greek origin, denoting origin from the Morea. The genitive case form Moraiti (Μωραΐτη) is used for female name-bearers. Notable people with this surname include:
Antonia Moraiti (born 1977), Greek water polo player and Olympic silver medalist
Chris Moraitis (born 1962), senior Australian public servant
Dimitrios Moraitis (born 1999), Greek basketball player
George Moraitis (born 1970), American politician
Nikolaos Moraitis (born 1957), Greek politician
Panagiotis Moraitis (born 1997), Greek footballer

Greek-language surnames
Surnames